Karel Lavický (born 8 November 1985, in České Budějovice) is a Czech windsurfer, who specializes in Neil Pryde RS:X class. As of September 2013, he is ranked no. 62 in the world for the sailboard class by the International Sailing Federation.

Lavicky competed in the men's RS:X class at the 2012 Summer Olympics in London qualifying through the World Championships in Cadiz, Spain. Struggling to attain a top position in the opening series including his black flag violation on the fourth leg, Lavicky accumulated a net score of 296 points for a thirty-sixth-place finish in a fleet of thirty-eight windsurfers.

References

External links
 
 
 
 
 
  

1985 births
Living people
Czech windsurfers
Czech male sailors (sport)
Olympic sailors of the Czech Republic
Sailors at the 2012 Summer Olympics – RS:X
Sailors at the 2016 Summer Olympics – RS:X
Sailors at the 2020 Summer Olympics – RS:X
Sportspeople from České Budějovice